Indrė Valantinaitė (born April 5, 1984 in Kaunas, Lithuania) is a Lithuanian poet.

After graduating from a Jesuit gymnasium, she studied arts management at Vilnius University and at the Vilnius Academy of Arts.

She published her poems in many periodicals, and printed her first book in 2006.

Her first book, Of Fish and Lilies earned her the first prize in the poetry category of the 2006 First Book Contest of the Lithuanian Union of Writers.

In addition to writing poems, Indrė is a singer, a winner of several singing festivals and appeared on TV.

References

1984 births
Living people
Lithuanian women poets
Vilnius University alumni
Vilnius Academy of Arts alumni
21st-century Lithuanian women writers